Pian Rural District is a rural district (dehestan) in the Central District of Izeh County, Khuzestan Province, Iran. At the 2006 census, its population was 11,782, in 2,091 families.  The rural district has 53 villages.

References 

Rural Districts of Khuzestan Province
Izeh County